The Tim Thering Octagon Barn built in 1907 is an historic octagonal barn built by Edgar Carpenter located north of 
Plain, Wisconsin. It is listed in Dale Travis' Wisconsin Round Barns List.

References

Octagon barns in the United States
Buildings and structures in Sauk County, Wisconsin
Barns in Wisconsin